Daniel Clark Blackburn (born May 20, 1983) is a Canadian former professional ice hockey goaltender. He played 63 regular-season games for the New York Rangers of the National Hockey League (NHL), going 20–32–11 with 1 shutout.

Minor league career
Born in Quebec, Blackburn moved to Canmore, Alberta as a teen and played major junior hockey with the Western Hockey League's Kootenay Ice in Cranbrook, British Columbia. In 2001, he was named the Canadian Hockey League's Goaltender of the Year. Blackburn was drafted by the New York Rangers in the first round of the 2001 NHL Entry Draft, 10th overall.

NHL career
For most of 2001–02, Blackburn served as backup to longtime Rangers goalie, Mike Richter, playing in 31 games, a large total for a backup goaltender. He was selected as the goaltender for the 2002 NHL All-Rookie Team and posted a 3.28 goals against average (GAA) and .898 save percentage.

With Richter out with a head injury, Blackburn recorded his only career shutout on November 7, 2002, in a 1–0 overtime win over the Calgary Flames. Blackburn dismissed concerns that the heavy workload would be too much for him by pointing out that he had endured a heavier workload in junior. However, after 17 consecutive starts, Blackburn eventually burned out, playing less effectively and tiring. It was becoming clear that Richter's difficulties with post-concussion syndrome were unlikely to abate, and that more help was needed. "We had to make a deal," Glen Sather claimed. "I did not want to see Danny lose his confidence and struggle, or for our team to struggle."

Sather traded for Nashville Predator Mike Dunham, an experienced number-one goaltender, to let Blackburn develop at a consistent rate. Blackburn finished the 2002–03 season with a 3.17 GAA and a .890 save percentage.

Injuries and retirement
A shoulder injury forced him into retirement in 2005.

He retired after missing the entire 2003–04 NHL season due to a nerve injury sustained just before training camp to his left shoulder due to a weightlifting mishap. He had nerve exploration surgery on March 31, 2004, then made an attempt to return to hockey, sporting a pair of blockers rather than the conventional blocker/catcher combination, as his injury rendered him incapable of rotating his glove hand. On February 1, 2005, he joined the Victoria Salmon Kings of the ECHL, going 3–9–0, with a 3.54 GAA in 12 games. On September 15, during the Rangers training camp, he suffered a strained MCL. Subsequently, Blackburn announced his retirement on September 25. Had Blackburn continued to attempt a comeback, he would have forfeited an insurance payout of approximately six million dollars.

After his retirement, Blackburn enrolled at Arizona State University. He later became the manager of business development for the Goaltender Development Institute. He currently resides in Dallas, Texas and Waltham, Massachusetts. When asked if he ever envisioned a return to hockey, he was quoted as saying, "Never, I doubt I will ever put goalie pads on again. I don't have interest in playing net." He also stated, "It's not bittersweet, you know what? I don't really miss it anymore - it's been such a long time. It was a chapter of my life and I'm on to the next....I don't have any regrets at all about what transpired or the way things happened for me. I really enjoy what I do now in the business world....From my point of view, I was really fortunate, even though I was only there for a couple of years. It really set up the rest of my life for all the things that I want to do, from there on out."

On December 31, 2011, Blackburn participated in the 2012 Winter Classic Alumni Game at Citizens Bank Park in Philadelphia, playing in goal for the Rangers alumni against the Philadelphia Flyers alumni.

Awards and honours

Career statistics

Regular season and playoffs

References

External links

1983 births
Canadian ice hockey goaltenders
Ice hockey people from Montreal
Kootenay Ice players
Living people
National Hockey League first-round draft picks
New York Rangers draft picks
New York Rangers players
Victoria Salmon Kings players